Henri-Irénée Marrou (12 November 1904 in Marseilles – 11 April 1977 in Bourg-la-Reine) was a French historian.  A Christian humanist in outlook, his work was primarily in the spheres of Late Antiquity and the history of education.  He is best known for his work History of Education in Antiquity. He also edited, for Sources Chrétiennes, the early Christian work Letter to Diognetus, the only manuscript of which perished in a fire at the University of Strasbourg during the Franco-Prussian War. Marrou edited the collection Patristica Sorbonensia, published by Le Seuil. His work has been criticised by the philosopher Ilsetraut Hadot. Marrou also wrote under the pseudonym of Henri Davenson. His Carnets posthumes were published in 2006 under the editorial supervision of his daughter Françoise Marrou-Flamant.

He was elected a foreign member of the Royal Netherlands Academy of Arts and Sciences in 1967.

Publications

 Fondements d'une culture chrétienne, Paris, Bloud & Gay, 1934 ;
 Saint Augustin et la fin de la culture antique, Paris, De Boccard, 1938 (thèse principale) ;
 MOYCIKOC ANHP. étude sur les scènes de la vie intellectuelle figurant sur les monuments funéraires romains, Grenoble, Didier & Richard, 1938 (thèse secondaire) ;
 Traité de la musique selon l'esprit de saint Augustin, Paris, Le Seuil, 1942 ;
 Le livre des chansons ou introduction à la connaissance de la chanson, Paris, Le Seuil, 1944 ;
 Histoire de l'éducation dans l'Antiquité, Paris, Le Seuil, 1948 ;
 L'ambivalence du temps de l'histoire chez saint Augustin, Paris, Vrin, 1950 ;
 De la connaissance historique, Paris, Le Seuil, 1954] ;
 Saint Augustin et l'augustinisme, Paris, Le Seuil, 1955 ;
 Les troubadours, Paris, Le Seuil, 1961 ;
 Nouvelle histoire de l'Église. Tome I, 2e partie: De la persécution de Dioclétien à la mort de Grégoire le Grand, Paris, Le Seuil, 1963 ;
 L'Église de l'Antiquité tardive 303-604, Paris, Le Seuil, collection « Points Histoire », 1985 (réédition séparée du titre précédent) ;
 Théologie de l'histoire, Paris, Le Seuil, 1968 ; réédition, Paris, Editions du Cerf, 2006 ;
 Patristique et humanisme, Paris, Le Seuil, 1976 ;
 Décadence romaine ou antiquité tardive?, Paris, Le Seuil, collection « Points Histoire », 1977] (posthume) ;
 Christiana tempora. Mélanges d'histoire, d'archéologie, d'épigraphie et de patristique, Rome, École française de Rome, 1978;
 Crise de notre temps et réflexion chrétienne (1930-1975), Paris, Beauchesne, 1978 (posthume);
 Carnets posthumes, Paris, Éditions du Cerf, 2006.

See also 
 Late Antiquity
 Marguerite Harl

References

External links
 Henri Irénée Marrou
 Survey of literature

1904 births
1977 deaths
Writers from Marseille
French Roman Catholic writers
École Normale Supérieure alumni
Christian humanists
Christian scholars
Members of the Académie des Inscriptions et Belles-Lettres
20th-century French historians
Patristic scholars
Members of the Royal Netherlands Academy of Arts and Sciences
Corresponding Fellows of the British Academy